Percy Allen may refer to:

Percival Allen (1917–2008), British geologist
Percy Allen (footballer) (1895–1969), English football player
Percy Allen (writer) (1875–1959), drama critic and writer on Shakespeare
Percy Allen (politician) (1913–1992), New Zealand politician
Percy Stafford Allen (1869–1933), British classical scholar
Percy Allen (ice hockey), in 1938 World Ice Hockey Championships

See also
Percy Allan (1861–1930), Australian civil engineer
Allen (surname)